Ambary (Ukrainian: Амбари) is a railway station in Ambary, Sumy Oblast, Ukraine. The station is on the Sumy Directorate of Southern Railways on the Bilopillya-Basy line.

Ambary is located in between Vyry ( away) and Holovashivka ( away) stations.

History

The station was opened in 1907 together with the construction of the section Vorozhba - Sumy - Kharkiv, when there was a need to connect the sugar factory in the village of Mykolaivka with the railway network. Four years later, in 1911, a short branch line was built to the Virynskyi Zavod station, since then the station has been a hub, with the help of the well-known sugar grower Pavlo Ivanovych Kharitonenko.

The historic station has survived to this day: the bright green rectangular building is almost completely devoid of decor and more reminiscent of a house, but the presence of rustic makes it brighter and more expressive.

Many sources indicate that the station was built in 1964, but this is not true. During World War II, the station was not damaged at all, photos from the 1940s have been preserved, where it is possible to see almost the same station as today. In the early 2000s the building was reconstructed, the roof completely redesigned. The oldest building at the station is a unique wooden water tower. It is small and painted green like the station.

Passenger service

Only suburban trains in the directions of Vorozhba, Sumy railway station, and Virynskyi Zavod stop here. Long-distance passenger trains do not stop at Ambary station.

Notes

 Tariff Guide No. 4. Book 1 (as of 05/15/2021) (Russian) Archived 05/15/2021.
 Arkhangelsky A.S., Arkhangelsky V.A. in two books. - M.: Transport, 1981. (rus.)

References

External Links

Ambary on railwayz.info
Passenger train schedule
Suburban train schedule
Ambary station on rail trips

Railway stations in Sumy Oblast
Sumy
Buildings and structures in Sumy Oblast